Viktor Prokopenko (24 October 1944 – 18 August 2007) was a Ukrainian football (soccer) player and coach who played in GDR and Ukrainian SSR including teams of the Soviet Top League and later worked as a coach in Russia and Ukraine.

Career

He was born in Zhdanov, Ukrainian SSR, which now known as Mariupol, Ukraine. In 1975, he graduated from the Odessa State Pedagogical Institute of Ushynsky and later the Moscow Higher School of Coaches.

Prokopenko was the first ever manager of the Ukraine national football team, and authored Flexibility, Strength, Endurance, a popular book on stretching.

Prokopenko was elected to the Ukrainian parliament for the Party of Regions as no.45 on their election list in the 2006 Ukrainian parliamentary election.

Prokopenko died in Odessa after a heart attack. He was 62 years old.

Honours
Chornomorets Odesa
USSR Federation Cup (1): 1990
Ukrainian Cup (2): 1992, 1993–94
Shakhtar Donetsk
Ukrainian Cup (1): 2000–01

References

External links
 Viktor Prokopenko at the Official Ukraine today.
 Statistics
  

1944 births
2007 deaths
Sportspeople from Mariupol
1. FC Frankfurt players
FC Nyva Vinnytsia players
FC Shakhtar Donetsk players
FC Chornomorets Odesa players
FC Krystal Kherson players
Soviet expatriate footballers
Expatriate footballers in East Germany
Ukrainian footballers
Soviet footballers
Soviet football managers
Ukrainian football managers
Ukraine national football team managers
FC Chornomorets Odesa managers
FC Shakhtar Donetsk managers
FC Rotor Volgograd managers
FC Dynamo Moscow managers
Russian Premier League managers
Expatriate football managers in Russia
Ukrainian Premier League managers
Higher School of Coaches alumni
Independent politicians in Ukraine
Party of Regions politicians
Fifth convocation members of the Verkhovna Rada
Ukrainian expatriate football managers
Ukrainian expatriate sportspeople in Russia
Association football forwards
K. D. Ushinsky South Ukrainian National Pedagogical University alumni
Politicians from Mariupol